Gormanston or Gormanstown could refer to:

Ireland
 Gormanston, County Meath, a village in the Republic of Ireland
 Gormanston railway station, County Meath, Republic of Ireland
 Gormanston Camp, a military installation in County Meath, Republic of Ireland
 Gormanston College, County Meath, Republic of Ireland

Other places
 Gormanston, Tasmania, town in Tasmania, Australia

See also
 Viscount Gormanston, a title in the Peerage of Ireland